Wayne Jim is a Canadian former politician, who represented the electoral district of McIntyre-Takhini in the Yukon Legislative Assembly from April 2000 to November 2002.

Jim was elected as a member of the Yukon Liberal Party in the 2000 election, unexpectedly defeating the Yukon NDP and Yukon Government Leader Piers McDonald. He was appointed Minister for Government Services by Yukon Premier Pat Duncan following the election. He was also appointed as a member of the Advisory Committee on Finance.

In 2002, Jim was dismissed from the post, and subsequently became one of three MLAs, along with Mike McLarnon and Don Roberts, who resigned or were dismissed from the Liberal caucus led by Premier Duncan, reducing Duncan's government to a minority. With a minority government, Duncan called an early election in 2002. Jim ran as an independent candidate, but came fourth  to Yukon Party candidate John Edzerza.

Jim also served on many wildlife and fishery boards and as Kwanlin Dun First Nation councillor. In 2011, Jim came third when he ran for the position of Chief of the Kwanlin Dun,

Electoral record

2002 general election

|-

| NDP
| Maureen Stephens
| align="right"|270
| align="right"|29.8%
| align="right"|-4.3%

| Liberal
| Judy Gingell
| align="right"|204
| align="right"|22.5%
| align="right"|-15.4%

| Independent
| Wayne Jim
| align="right"|129
| align="right"|14.2%
| align="right"|+14.2%

| Independent
| Geoffrey Capp
| align="right"|15
| align="right"|1.7%
| align="right"|+1.7%
|-
! align=left colspan=3|Total
! align=right|906
! align=right|100.0%
! align=right| –
|}

2000 general election

|-

| Liberal
| Wayne Jim
| align="right"| 376
| align="right"| 37.9%
| align="right"| +17.7%

| NDP
| Piers McDonald
| align="right"| 338
| align="right"| 34.1%
| align="right"| -14.9%

|-
! align=left colspan=3|Total
! align=right| 991
! align=right| 100.0%
! align=right| –
|}

References

1961 births
21st-century Canadian politicians
21st-century First Nations people
First Nations politicians
Independent MLAs in Yukon
Living people
Politicians from Whitehorse
Tutchone people
Yukon Liberal Party MLAs